In This Life may refer to:

 In This Life (Collin Raye album), 1992
 "In This Life" (Collin Raye song), the title song
 In This Life (Elise Testone album), 2014
 "In This Life" (Delta Goodrem song), 2007
 In This Life, a 1989 album by Thinking Plague
 In This Life, a  2012 album by Chantal Kreviazuk
 "In This Life", a funeral-inspired song by Madonna from Erotica (1992)
 "In This Life", a song by Israel Kamakawiwoʻole from N Dis Life (1996)
 "In This Life", a song by Chantal Kreviazuk from What If It All Means Something (2002)
 "In This Life" (The Walking Dead: World Beyond), an episode of the first season of The Walking Dead: World Beyond
 "In This Life", a song by Seemless from the album Seemless, 2005